The 2018 Coupe du Faso is the 32nd edition of the Coupe du Faso (51st edition including earlier cup competitions), the knockout football competition of Burkina Faso.

First round
[Mar 11]

Wend Panga FC              o/w US Passoré                 [Wend Panga forfeited]

US BAM                     1-3 Sané Sports de Poura

Santa Club de Niangologolo w/o Nalambou FC                [Nalambou forfeited]

OSK                        2-1 AFP

US Poni                    o/w Dori FC                    [Poni forfeited] 

ES du Kadiogo              2-0 JEK FC

ASKO                       0-2 ASPC Tenkodogo 

USFRAN                     0-0 Rahimo FC                  [2-4 pen]

Second round
[Mar 28]

ASO                        0-1 AS Maya

OSK                        0-4 ASEC Koudougou             

KOZAF                      w/o Kiko FC                    [Kiko forfeited] 

BPS                        0-1 AS Tema Bokin

EAZ                        2-2 9 AC                       [4-2 pen]

CFFEB                      w/o FALEM                      [FALEM forfeited]

AFACB                      0-0 ASPC Tenkodogo             [5-4 pen]  

Léopards St. Cam           3-0 Faso AC

IFFA Matroukou             0-0 ASK                        [4-1 pen]

Bafudji FC                 6-1 Sané Sports de Poura

Canon du Sud               0-0 AS Douanes                 [4-5 pen]

Royal FC                   o/w US Dori                    [Royal forfeited]                  

JCB                        0-1 AS ECO

Fabao Espoir               2-0 ES du Kadiogo

US Yatenga                 o/w Santa Club de Niangologolo [Yatenga forfeited]

US Passoré                 0-1 Rahimo FC

Third round
[Apr 4]

Bobo Sport                 0-0 EFO                        [4-3 pen]

Santa Club Niangologolo    0-2 AS Police

ASEC Koudougou             w/o Bafudji FC                 [Bafudji forfeited]

USFA                       2-0 Fabao Espoir            

RCB                        2-1 Rahimo FC

Léopards St. Cam           1-0 AS ECO

CFFEB                      1-2 ASFA Yennega

Santos FC                  0-0 AFACB                      [5-4 pen]

USCO                       1-2 USO

US Dori                    o/w AS Tema Bokin              [Dori forfeited]

AS Douanes                 1-2 EAZ

IFFA Matroukou             1-0 KOZAF

AS Maya                    0-1 AS Sonabel

RCK                        2-0 Ajeb

Salitas FC                 1-0 Majestic SC

Round of 16
[Apr 15]

Santos FC                  0-4 AS Sonabel

ASFB                       0-0 EAZ                        [4-3 pen]

ASFA Yennega               1-0 AS Police

IFFA Matroukou             0-1 RCK

ASEC Koudougou             1-0 RCB

Salitas FC                 1-0 AS Tema Bokin            

USFA                       3-1 Léopards St. Cam

USO                        1-0 Bobo Sport

Quarterfinals
[May 9]

ASFA Yennega               0-1 Salitas FC

ASEC Koudougou             1-1 AS Sonabel                 [3-4 pen]

ASFB                       1-1 USFA                       [4-1 pen]

RCK                        2-0 USO

Semifinals
[May 16]

AS Sonabel                 1-2 Salitas FC                 

ASFB                       1-1 RCK                        [5-4 pen]

Final
[May 27]

Salitas FC                 2-0 ASFB

See also
2017–18 Burkinabé Premier League

References

Burkina Faso
Cup
Football competitions in Burkina Faso